

Arnold Freiherr von Biegeleben (16 April 1883 – 11 October 1940) was a German general during World War II who commanded the 6th Infantry Division of the Wehrmacht. He was awarded the Knight's Cross of the Iron Cross. 

Biegeleben died of a heart attack on 11 October 1940.

Awards and decorations
 Iron Cross (1914) 2nd Class (14 September 1914) & 1st Class (3 March 1916)
 Knight's Cross of the Royal House Order of Hohenzollern with Swords (24 November 1917)
 Grand Officer Cross of the Order of St Alexander (15 September 1936)
 Wehrmacht Long Service Award 1st to 4th Class (2 October 1936)
 Clasp to the Iron Cross (1939) 2nd Class (6 October 1939) & 1st Class (30 October 1939)
 Knight's Cross of the Iron Cross on 5 August 1940 as Generalleutnant and commander of 6th Infantry Division

References

Citations

Bibliography

 
 

1883 births
1940 deaths
Lieutenant generals of the German Army (Wehrmacht)
Military personnel from Hanover
German Army personnel of World War I
Recipients of the Knight's Cross of the Iron Cross
Barons of Germany
People from the Province of Hanover
Recipients of the clasp to the Iron Cross, 1st class
Burials at La Cambe German war cemetery